Komm zurück may refer to:

 Come Back (film), a 1953 West German film
 "J'attendrai", a 1938 French song recorded in German as "Komm zurück"
 "Komm zurück/Die Banane", songs by German rock band Die Ärzte